Parandraceps turnbowi is a species of beetle in the family Cerambycidae, the only species in the genus Parandraceps.

References

Hesperophanini